Hispania Citerior (English: "Hither Iberia", or "Nearer Iberia") was a Roman province in Hispania during the Roman Republic. It was on the eastern coast of Iberia down to the town of Cartago Nova, today's Cartagena in the autonomous community of Murcia, Spain. It roughly covered today's Spanish autonomous communities of Catalonia and Valencia. Further south was the Roman province of Hispania Ulterior ("Further Iberia"), named as such because it was further away from Rome.

The two provinces were established in 197 BC, four years after the end of the Second Punic War (218–201 BC). During this war Scipio Africanus defeated the Carthaginians at the Battle of Ilipa (near Seville) in 206 BC. This led to the Romans taking over the Carthaginian possessions in southern Spain and on the east coast up to the River Ebro. Several governors of Hispania Citerior commanded wars against the Celtiberians who lived to the west of this province. In the late first century BC Augustus reorganised the Roman provinces in Hispania. Hispania Citerior was replaced by the larger province of Hispania Tarraconensis, which included the territories the Romans had subsequently conquered in central, northern and north-western Hispania. Augustus also renamed Hispania Ulterior as Hispania Baetica and created a third province, Hispania Lusitania.

Etymology
Hispania is the Latin term given to the Iberian peninsula. The term can be traced back to at least 200 BC, when it was used by the poet Quintus Ennius. The word is possibly derived from the Punic אי שפן "I-Shaphan" meaning "coast of hyraxes", in turn a misidentification on the part of Phoenician explorers of its numerous rabbits as hyraxes. According to the Roman historian Cassius Dio, the people of the region came from many different tribes and did not share a common language or a common government.

See also
 Pre-Roman peoples of the Iberian Peninsula
 Hispania Ulterior
 Hispania Tarraconensis
 Hispania Baetica
 Hispania Lusitana

References

External links
Detailed map of the Pre-Roman Peoples of Iberia (around 200 BC)

Roman provinces in Hispania
197 BC
190s BC establishments
2nd-century BC establishments in Spain
States and territories established in the 2nd century BC
2nd-century BC establishments in the Roman Republic
1st century BC in Hispania
States and territories disestablished in the 1st century BC
1st-century BC disestablishments in the Roman Empire
1st-century BC disestablishments
1st-millennium BC disestablishments in Spain
Provinces of the Roman Republic
History of Catalonia
Establishments in Spain in the Roman era